Vilnius Heat Plant or Vilnius Power Plant-2 is a power plant in Vilnius, Lithuania. Its capacity is 913 megawatts (MW) heating power and 24 MW electric power. It is operated by Vilniaus Energija UAB, a subsidiary of Dalkia.

The power plant is fueled by natural gas and heavy fuel oil (mazut). There is a plan to transfer it to biofuel based on a mixture of wood, straw and peat.

References 

Energy infrastructure completed in 1951
Cogeneration power stations in Lithuania
Natural gas-fired power stations in Lithuania
Oil-fired power stations in Lithuania
Power stations in Vilnius
Power stations built in the Soviet Union